Alex Mashinsky (born October 5, 1965) is an entrepreneur and business executive. He was the founder and CEO of Celsius Network, a cryptocurrency lending platform, which filed for Chapter 11 bankruptcy on July 13, 2022.

In the early 1990s, Mashinsky founded VoiceSmart, one of the first firms to offer telecommunications switches to handle ordinary voice as well as Voice over IP call routing. Mashinsky founded GroundLink in 2004 as a service to book an on-demand limousine and car services from a computer or smartphone. He was also the founder of Q-Wireless, which later became part of Transit Wireless. From 2014 to 2015, Mashinsky served as CEO of Novatel.

Early life 
Mashinsky was born in 1965 in Ukraine to a Jewish family. His family obtained permission to leave the country in the 1970s and later moved to Israel. From an early age, he was a tinkerer, like his father, and would tap into and use public phone lines in Israel. As a teenager, he bought confiscated goods from Ben Gurion Airport at auction and resold them for a profit.

Mashinsky attended a few different universities where he majored in electrical engineering but did not graduate. He served in the Israeli Army, where he trained as a pilot and served in the Golani Brigade, from 1984 to 1987. In 1988, he left Israel and moved to the United States.

Career 

Mashinsky has worked in a variety of different industries, often focusing on popular technologies. The Wall Street Journal described him in 2022 as "a brash, confident serial entrepreneur with a constant stream of big ideas". On several occasions, Mashinsky has left his companies after a period of conflict or tension.

After relocating to New York City, Mashinsky ran a business trading contracts for delivery of chemicals such as urea, gold, and sodium cyanide. However, after the Tiananmen Square protests of 1989, the business slowed as exports of sodium cyanide from China fizzled. Mashinsky then worked at A+ Systems, a computer-based voicemail software company for phone carriers.

Telecommunications companies

He was also an early developer of voice over Internet Protocol (VOIP). In the early 1990s, he founded VoiceSmart, one of the first companies to offer computer-based VOIP phone service. By 1993, Mashinsky had realized the potential for a commodity market for international telephone capacity. So, in 1996, Mashinsky founded Arbinet, a marketplace for VoIP telephone service. The platform was one of the first to allow telecommunication companies to trade minutes. In November 1997, Arbinet began offering a similar service for data connectivity, allowing the more than 400 T1 lines connected to its New York hub to exchange their unused bandwidth.

In 2005, he sold his stake in Arbinet and used part of the profits from the sale to start GroundLink. The company allowed people to book limousine and car service from a smartphone or computer. Mashinsky was inspired to start the company after a car he had reserved for himself and his wife failed to pick them up, along with a business associate he was trying to impress, from the airport. In 2010, Mashinsky organized a joint venture between GroundLink and several limousine and car service companies. These companies with LimoRes Car & Limo Service, a company Mashinsky also founded, installed free Wi-Fi service funded solely by sales of advertising. He also partnered with Gogo Inflight Internet to offer the free service on US flights.

Mashinsky's company Q-Wireless is one of the four companies that made up Transit Wireless, a joint venture to install wireless cellphone and free Wi-Fi internet service in the New York City Subway system. It took Mashinsky three years to convince Metropolitan Transportation Authority to initiate a survey to determine if there was a demand for cell phone service inside the subway system and two more years for the authority to request a proposal. By 2010, his company had received a contract to install the service at 277 below-ground subway stations in New York City.

In April 2014, Mashinsky was named to the board of directors of Novatel, a provider of Wi-Fi hotspot products. He was appointed CEO in June of that year. In October 2015, Mashinsky left his position at Novatel after a year and a half as CEO of the company. In a 2018 deposition, Mashinsky said that he was terminated from his post because he refused to move from New York to Novatel's San Diego headquarters.

RTX, a London-based financial technology firm in the telecom industry, hired Mashinsky as Global CEO in September 2016. After six months in the role, following a dispute with management, Mashinsky left the company, according to his 2018 deposition.

Celsius Network 
In 2017, Mashinsky founded Celsius Network, a borrowing and lending platform for digital assets like Bitcoin, Ethereum and other cryptocurrencies. It encouraged its customers to "unbank" themselves and offered interest rates as high as 18.6 per cent on cryptocurrency deposits.

As CEO, he hosted "Ask Mashinsky Anything", a weekly YouTube livestream in which he answered questions about Celsius. He became known for wearing T-shirts reading "Banks are not your friends", for his critical comments about unsuccessful businesses (including his own), and for publicity stunts such as an attempt to vandalize a branch of Chase Bank.

In January 2022, Mashinsky took control of Celsius's trading strategy. Some insiders reported that he personally directed large individual cryptocurrency trades, overruling executives with significant financial experience.

Mashinsky withdrew $10 million from Celsius in May 2022. The withdrawals came as customers were withdrawing assets in large quantities while the company was nearing bankruptcy, according to a report in October 2022. A spokesperson for Mashinsky told the Financial Times that the funds were used for tax payments and estate planning. In total, Arkham Intelligence estimates that Mashinsky sold $44 million worth of CEL tokens through exchanges.

On July 13, 2022, one month after it paused customer withdrawals, Celsius filed for Chapter 11 bankruptcy. Mashinsky said that "the Company made what, in hindsight, proved to be certain poor asset deployment decisions."

Mashinsky resigned as Celsius CEO on September 27, 2022. Chris Ferraro, the former CFO of Celsius, was appointed to replace him as interim CEO. The Unsecured Creditors Committee, an organization of depositors, described the executive change as "a positive step" towards resolving the cases against Celsius.

Recognition
Mashinsky was listed in Business Insiders "The Silicon Alley 100: New York’s Coolest Tech People" in 2010. As head of LimoRes, Mashinsky was selected as one of Crain's Top Entrepreneurs in 2010. His VoIP intellectual property was recognized by Internet Telephony magazine in its list of Top 100 VoIP Communications. He was awarded the Albert Einstein Technology Medal in 2000, and the Technology Foresight Award for Innovation in 1999. He won the Catalyst of Innovation Award from TechUnited:NJ on May 25, 2022.

Criticism and legal issues

On January 31, 2023, Shoba Pillay, a court-appointed examiner and a former federal prosecutor, filed a 470-page report on Celsius (with an additional 200 pages of appendices) with the bankruptcy court. Pillay's report, as interpreted by Molly White, was particularly critical of the weekly "Ask Mashinsky Anything" livestreams, which were later edited and published as videos on demand:

The Pillay report also noted that Mashinsky had not personally read Celsius's terms of use, and had made many public statements that contradicted the terms. Mashinsky repeatedly claimed that Celsius's CEL token was "registered" with the SEC, when it was not. The report described Mashinsky as personally intervening in key decisions such as Celsius's reward amounts, and it said that he personally benefited from selling CEL tokens, whose value Celsius pumped at his direction. Although Mashinsky told customers that the CEL token's value reflected the business's value, the Pillay report quoted internal conversations between employees who said that CEL should be valued at $0.

On January 5, 2023, the Attorney General of New York filed a civil lawsuit against Mashinsky, accusing him of violating the state's Martin Act. Letitia James's office seeks a fine against Mashinsky, monetary damages, and a ban that would prevent him from leading a company or working in the securities industry in the state of New York.

Personal life 
Mashinsky lives in New York City with his wife, Krissy Mashinsky, and six children. Krissy runs the online retailer usastrong.IO, which attracted controversy for selling shirts reading "Unbankrupt Yourself", a play on Celsius Network’s slogan "Unbank Yourself", after Celsius went bankrupt.

References 

American chief executives
Living people
Soviet emigrants to Israel
Israeli emigrants to the United States
American technology businesspeople
1965 births
20th-century American businesspeople
21st-century American businesspeople
American company founders